Nicholas Vaux, 1st Baron Vaux of Harrowden (c. 1460 – 14 May 1523) was a soldier and courtier in England and an early member of the House of Commons. He was the son of Lancastrian loyalists Sir William Vaux of Harrowden and Katherine Penyson (or Peniston as she is sometimes called in later sources), a lady of the household of Queen Margaret of Anjou, wife of the Lancastrian king, Henry VI of England. Katherine was a daughter of Gregorio Panizzone of Courticelle (modern Cortiglione), in Piedmont, Italy which was at that time subject to King René of Anjou, father of Queen Margaret of Anjou, as ruler of Provence. He grew up during the years of Yorkist rule and later served under the founder of the Tudor dynasty, Henry VII.

Overview

Nicholas Vaux's mother, Katherine, an attendant on Margaret of Anjou, remained constant to her mistress when others forsook the Lancastrian cause. Katherine's husband, Sir William Vaux, whom she had married not long before she obtained her letters of denization, was attainted in 1461 and later slain at the Battle of Tewkesbury. 

Despite her husband's misfortune, Katherine Vaux remained loyal to her mistress: she stayed by the Queen during her imprisonment in the Tower of London, and on Margaret's release in 1476 went with her into exile (as she had done earlier in the 1460s), living with her until her death six years later. Katherine's two children did not share either her confinement or her travels abroad; instead, Nicholas Vaux and his sister Joan, were brought up in the household of Lady Margaret Beaufort (mother of Henry VII), without charge, even though Edward IV restored two manors to the family for the maintenance of him and his sister.

Katherine's devotion was rewarded after the triumph of Henry VII at Bosworth, where Nicholas Vaux, as a protégé of Lady Margaret Beaufort, probably fought under her husband Thomas Stanley, 1st Earl of Derby; the petition for the reversal of the attainder on Vaux's father and the forfeiture of his property was accepted by the King in the Parliament of 1485, and not long after Vaux was named to the commission of the peace for his home county.

Politics

He fought for Henry VII at Stoke and Blackheath, being knighted on the field for his service in both battles. Not only was he active and diligent in local government but he was also frequently at court attending all the great state occasions at home and abroad until his death; in 1511 he entertained Henry VIII at Harrowden. It was as a soldier and diplomat, however, that he made his mark. Given the important command at Guisnes, he distinguished himself during the Tournai campaign in 1513 and then in the missions (he had had some earlier experiences in negotiating, chiefly with Burgundy) to the French King about the English withdrawal and the several royal marriage treaties. 

Later, he was one of the devisers of the Field of the Cloth of Gold. His sister, Joan, had also benefited from the change of dynasty: she entered the royal household, became governess to Henry VII's daughters and married successively Sir Richard Guildford and the father of Sir Nicholas Poyntz, Sir Anthony Poyntz.

Vaux was a natural candidate for election to Parliament, although in the absence of so many returns for the early Tudor period he is known to have been a Member only in 1515 when he and Sir John Hussey took a memorandum on certain Acts from the Commons up to the Lords. Presumably, he sat for his own shire on this occasion as he was afterwards appointed to the Northamptonshire commission for the subsidy which he had helped to grant.

Missions to France
On 4 September 1514, Vaux with his second wife Anne Green were part of the delegation tasked with delivering Princess Mary, the king's sister, to Abbeville in France to be married to King Louis XII of France. He also was present with his second wife Anne Green at the Field of the Cloth of Gold in 1520 where he attended upon the King and Queen Catherine of Aragon. He was joined by Sir Thomas Parr, his wife Maud Green, and his brother Sir William Parr of Horton.

Marriages & issue
Vaux married twice:
Firstly to Elizabeth FitzHugh (d.29 January 1508), widow of Sir William Parr of Kendal, and daughter of Henry FitzHugh, 5th Baron FitzHugh of Ravensworth, by his wife Alice Neville, a niece of Cecily Neville, Duchess of York. The wedding took place most likely after the 1485 Battle of Bosworth when Henry Tudor (later King Henry VII) defeated Richard III. The union was most likely planned to secure the allegiance of the FitzHugh family to the new Tudor dynasty as Henry VII's wife, Elizabeth of York, was a granddaughter of Cecily Neville, Duchess of York. By his first wife he had three daughters:
Katherine Vaux (c.1490-1571), who married Sir George Throckmorton of Coughton Court in Warwickshire, and had issue;
Alice Vaux (d.1543), who, in about 1501, married Sir Richard Sapcote, without issue;
Anne Vaux, who married Sir Thomas Le Strange (1493–1545) and had issue.
Secondly, shortly after the death of his first wife, he married  Anne Green (who predeceased him), a daughter and co-heiress of Sir Thomas Green of Boughton and Green's Norton, Northamptonshire, by his wife Jane Fogge. Anne Green was the aunt of Queen Catherine Parr (whose mother was Maud Green), the sixth wife of King Henry VIII. By his second wife he had two sons and three daughters:
Thomas Vaux, 2nd Baron Vaux of Harrowden (1510 – Oct 1556), eldest son and heir, who, in about 1523, married Elizabeth Cheney (1505-1556), a grand-daughter of his father's first wife (Elizabeth Cheney was a daughter of Sir Thomas Cheney of Irtlingburgh by his wife Anne Parr, a daughter of Sir William Parr by his second wife Elizabeth FitzHugh).
William Vaux (d. May 1523), who died unmarried.
Margaret Vaux, who married Sir Francis Pulteney (1502 – c. 17 May 1548) of Misterton. Had issue. She married secondly to Sir Francis Verney (1531/34-59), of Salden in Mursley, Bucks. and London. No issue. Issue of Margaret and Francis Pulteney include:
Sir Gabriel Pulteney (d. 31 August 1599) of Knowle Hall, who married Dorothy Spencer, a daughter of Sir William Spencer of Althorp in Northamptonshire.
Bridget Vaux, who in about 1538 married Maurice Welsh;
Maud Vaux (d. 14 April 1569), who married Sir John Fermor of Easton Neston in Northamptonshire, by whom she had issue including:
Katherine Fermor, who married Sir Henry Darcy, a son of Sir Arthur Darcy (a descendant of the Barons Darcy of Knaith) by his wife, Mary Carew.

In popular culture
Sir Nicholas Vaux is a character in William Shakespeare's Henry VIII.

Ancestry

Notes

References

 Throckmorton family history: being the records of the Throckmortons in the United States of America with cognate branches, emigrant ancestors located at Salem, Massachusetts, 1630, and in Gloucester county, Virginia, 1660
 Ancestral roots of certain American colonists who came to America by Frederick Lewis Weis, Walter Lee Sheppard, David Faris.
 Catholic gentry in English society: the Throckmortons of Coughton by Peter Marshall
 Women and politics in early modern England, 1450–1700 By James Daybell
 The Magna Charta sureties, 1215: the barons named in the Magna Charta, 1215 by Frederick Lewis Weis
 The Family Forest Descendants of Lady Joan Beaufort by Bruce Harrison
 The House of Commons: 1509 – 1558 ; 1, Appendices, constituencies, members A – C, Volume 4
 
 Six Wives: The Queens of Henry VIII by David Starkey
 Katherine, the Queen by Linda Porter
 Kateryn Parr: the making of a queen by Susan E. James

|-

1460 births
Vaux of Harrowden, Nicholas Vaux, 1st Baron
15th-century English soldiers
16th-century English soldiers
16th-century English nobility
Barons Vaux of Harrowden
English knights
English soldiers
Nicholas
English people of Italian descent